State Islamic Institute of Teungku Dirundeng Meulaboh (Indonesian: STAIN Teungku Dirundeng Meulaboh, abbreviated STAIN TDM) is an Indonesian Islamic public university in Meulaboh, West Aceh Regency.

History 
The institution was originally a high school. On September 19, 2014, it was officially integrated by the Ministry of Religious Affairs and became a public Islamic university (Perguruan Tinggi Keagamaan Islam Negeri), the fourth in the province (after Ar-Raniry University in Banda Aceh, IAIN Lhokseumawe in Lhokseumawe, IAIN Langsa in Langsa and IAIN Takengon in Takengon) and the first in the southwest.

Dr. Syamusar was the chairperson from 2015 to 2019, appointed by the Minister of Religious Affairs Lukman Hakim Syaifuddin on January 7, 2015. On January 7, 2019, Syaifuddin sworn in Dr. Inayatillah as the chairperson.

On June, 2021, the Supreme Court granted STAIN TDM's cassation in the campus land dispute, so that STAIN TDM can resume activities on the new campus.

School 
According to a study published in Bidayah, student satisfaction with the quality of services was not optimal.

References 

Universities in Aceh
Islamic universities and colleges in Indonesia
Educational institutions established in 1986
Universities established in the 1980s
1986 establishments in Indonesia